Jake Dunford (born 24 June 1994) is a Jersey international cricketer. He played in the 2016 ICC World Cricket League Division Five tournament. Prior to the World Cricket League tournament, he made his first-class debut for Durham MCCU against Gloucestershire on 31 March 2016.

He played for Jersey in the 2016 ICC World Cricket League Division Four matches held in Los Angeles.

He is currently the ICC World Cricket League record holder for the most dismissals in a single tournament, with 21 (18 catches and 3 stumpings) in the ICC WCL Division 5 tournament. This broke the previous record of 19 shared by Jeroen Smits of the Netherlands (at the 2009 World Cup Qualifier) and Denzil Sequeira of Botswana (at the 2013 WCL Division Seven).

In April 2018, he was named in Jersey's squad for the 2018 ICC World Cricket League Division Four tournament in Malaysia. In August 2018, he was named in Jersey's squad for the 2018–19 ICC World Twenty20 Europe Qualifier tournament in the Netherlands.

In May 2019, he was named in Jersey's squad for the 2019 T20 Inter-Insular Cup against Guernsey. He made his Twenty20 International (T20I) debut for Jersey against Guernsey on 31 May 2019. The same month, he was named in Jersey's squad for the Regional Finals of the 2018–19 ICC T20 World Cup Europe Qualifier tournament in Guernsey.

In September 2019, he was named in Jersey's squad for the 2019 ICC T20 World Cup Qualifier tournament in the United Arab Emirates. Ahead of the tournament, the International Cricket Council (ICC) named him as the player to watch in Jersey's squad.  In November 2019, he was named in Jersey's squad for the Cricket World Cup Challenge League B tournament in Oman. He made his List A debut, for Jersey against Uganda, on 2 December 2019.

In October 2021, Dunford was named in Jersey's T20I squad for the Regional Final of the 2021 ICC Men's T20 World Cup Europe Qualifier tournament.

References

External links
 

1996 births
Living people
Jersey cricketers
Jersey Twenty20 International cricketers
Durham MCCU cricketers
Place of birth missing (living people)